Joe Calvert (3 February 1907 – 23 December 1999) was a British professional footballer who played as a goalkeeper for Bristol Rovers, Leicester City and Watford.

Career
Calvert began his career in senior non-league football, playing for Owston in the Doncaster League before being signed by Frickley Colliery in the 1929/30 season. There is some evidence to suggest he was signed by Hull City in the 1930/31 season but did not make a senior appearance for the club, before transferring to Bristol Rovers in the 1931/32 season. After one season at Bristol Rovers Calvert moved to Leicester City and became dedicated servant of the club, including during the Second World War. In January 1948 Calvert requested a transfer and was sold to Watford where he played only a handful of games.

Records
He is one of the oldest players ever to play for either Leicester or Watford in the Football League; he transferred from Leicester to Watford a few weeks before his 41st birthday.

References

1907 births
1999 deaths
English footballers
Association football goalkeepers
English Football League players
Bristol Rovers F.C. players
Leicester City F.C. players
Hull City A.F.C. players
Frickley Athletic F.C. players
Watford F.C. players
People from Beighton, Sheffield
Footballers from Derbyshire